The Feast of Herod is a c.1635-1638 oil on canvas painting by Peter Paul Rubens, now in the National Galleries of Scotland, for which it was bought in 1958.

It shows a scene from the Gospels in which Herodias' daughter received John the Baptist's head as a reward for her dancing. The work was probably commissioned by patron and collector Gaspar Roomer and possibly helped introduce a neo-Venetian style to Naples which would have a major impact on the evolution of the city's own strand of Baroque painting.

References

Paintings by Peter Paul Rubens
1630s paintings
Paintings in the National Galleries of Scotland
Paintings depicting John the Baptist
Paintings depicting New Testament people
Paintings depicting Salome